Tojang or Doejang may stand for:

Doenjang, a traditional Korean fermented soybean paste
Dojang, a formal training hall in Korean martial arts
Dojang (device) or Tojang, a seal or stamp used in lieu of signature in several Asian countries